Marcel Merkès (7 July 1920 – 30 March 2007) was a French tenor operetta singer.

Merkès was born in Bordeaux.  After receiving several prizes in singing at the Conservatoire de Bordeaux, he started at the age of 22 years at the Grand Théâtre de Bordeaux in the role of Des Grieux in Manon, an opera by Jules Massenet. He often performed an operetta duo with his wife Paulette Merval, a singer and violinist, who he had met at the Conservatoire de Bordeaux. They totaled more than 10,500 performances and recorded many records in their careers. He was a prolific performer at the Théâtre Mogador in Paris.

Merkès was married to violinist and singer Paulette Merval. Their son, Alain Merkès, also pursued a career as singer under the name Alain Valmer.  Marcel died in Pessac.

Notable performances
Notable performances, debut of performance is given:

Rêve de Valse by Oscar Straus – Théâtre Mogador, Paris, 22 March 1947
Imperial Violets by Vincent Scotto – Théâtre Mogador, Paris, 31 January 1948
Annie du Far-West by Irving Berlin – Théâtre du Châtelet, Paris, 19 February 1950
Rose-Marie by Rudolf Friml – Théâtre de l'Empire, 12 May 1950
La Veuve joyeuse by Franz Lehár – Théâtre Mogador, Paris, 17 November 1951
Les Amants de Venise by Vincent Scotto – Théâtre Mogador, Paris, 5 December 1953
Les amours de Don Juan by Juan Morata – Théâtre Mogador, Paris, 23 December 1955
Michel Strogoff by Jack Ledru – Théâtre Mogador, Paris, 5 December 1964
Vienne chante et Danse by Johann Strauss II and Jack Ledru – Théâtre Mogador, Paris, 25 November 1967
Douchka by Georges Garvarentz and Charles Aznavour – Théâtre Mogador, Paris, 4 October 1973
Princesse Czardas by Emmerich Kálmán, Avignon 1979–1982

Filmography
Trois de la Canebière by Maurice de Canonge (1956)
 Three Sailors by Maurice de Canonge (1957)

References

External links
Biography, photos 

1920 births
2007 deaths
Musicians from Bordeaux
Conservatoire de Bordeaux alumni
20th-century French male opera singers
French operatic tenors